FC Myllypuro is a football club from Myllypuro, Helsinki, Finland. The club was formed in 2013 when it resigned from MaKu into its own organization. FC Myllypuro play their home matches at Myllypuron liikuntapuisto. The team currently plays in the Kakkonen (third tier in Finland).

Current squad

First Team

References
Official Website
http://fcmyllypuro.blogspot.fi/

Association football clubs established in 2013
Football clubs in Helsinki